Nostra Signora de La Salette is a church in Rome, in the Gianicolense district, in the square Our Lady of La Salette.

History

It was built between 1957 and 1965 to a design by architects Vivina Rizzi and Ennio Canino and dedicated to Our Lady of La Salette.
The church is home parish, established June 18, 1957 with the decree of the Cardinal Vicar Clemente Micara "Neminem quidem fugit", and entrusted to the Missionaries of Our Lady of La Salette, who are its owners. It also is home to the "cardinal's title Our Lady of La Salette", founded by Pope Paul VI April 29, 1969.  Polycarp Pengo is the incumbent cardinal-protector since 1998.

Description

The exterior is preceded by a wide staircase that leads to the temple. The facade is divided into two terraces: the first has set the entry; the second is characterized by tall windows that form the backdrop to the titular statue of the Madonna, which appeared in 1846 in La Salette in France, which juts out like a high canopy of reinforced concrete. The church is flanked by a bell tower, among the highest of Rome (the Quercioli the extent to 52 meters).
The interior has a central plan with brick walls that converge sinuously to the only altar. According to the Quercioli
"Our Lady of La Salette by many is considered a sacred architecture cornerstone of our days. » (Quercioli M., op.cit. P.375)

Cardinal Priest
Pope Paul VI established it as a titular church on 30 April 1969.

Alfredo Scherer, 30 April 1969 appointed- 9 March 1996 died
Polycarp Pengo, 21 February 2001 appointed- present

References
Pope Paul VI established as titular church on 30 April 1969

External links
Nostra Signora de La Salette

Titular churches
Rome Q. XII Gianicolense
Roman Catholic churches completed in 1965
20th-century Roman Catholic church buildings in Italy